Saroykamar Panj is a football club from Panj in Tajikistan.

History

Domestic history

References

Football clubs in Tajikistan